Trumpler 15 is an open cluster in the constellation Carina that lies on the outskirts of the Carina Nebula. Estimated ages of the stars in Trumpler 15 suggest that the cluster is slightly older than its sibling clusters Trumpler 14 and 16.

References

External links
 

Carina Nebula
Open clusters
Carina (constellation)
Trumpler catalog
Star-forming regions